King of Chinatown is a 1939 American crime film directed by Nick Grinde and written by Lillie Hayward and Irving Reis. The film stars Anna May Wong, Akim Tamiroff, J. Carrol Naish, Sidney Toler, Philip Ahn, Anthony Quinn and Bernadene Hayes. The film was released on March 17, 1939, by Paramount Pictures.

Plot
Violence and death stalk the Chinese of a big American city, but one man, Dr. Chang Ling, and his daughter, Dr. Mary Ling, defy the racketeers who are responsible, and, against terrific odds, bring peace to their oppressed neighbors.

Cast
Anna May Wong as Dr. Mary Ling
Akim Tamiroff as Frank Baturin
J. Carrol Naish as Professor
Sidney Toler as Dr. Chang Ling
Philip Ahn as Robert 'Bob' Li
Anthony Quinn as Mike Gordon
Bernadene Hayes as Dolly Warren
Roscoe Karns as 'Rip' Harrigan
Ray Mayer as 'Potatoes'
Richard Denning as Protective Association Henchman
Archie Twitchell as Hospital Interne
Eddie Marr as Henchman Bert
George Anderson as Detective
Charles B. Wood as Henchman Red
George Magrill as Second Gangster
Charles Trowbridge as Dr. Jones
Lily King as Chinese Woman
Wong Chung as Chinese Man
Chester Gan as Mr. Foo
Pat West as Fight Announcer
Guy Usher as Investigator

References

External links
 

1939 films
1930s English-language films
Paramount Pictures films
American crime films
1939 crime films
Films directed by Nick Grinde
American black-and-white films
1930s American films